Dan Hartleb (born February 15, 1966) is an American baseball coach and former catcher, who is the current the head baseball coach of the Illinois Fighting Illini. Hartleb played two seasons of junior college baseball at John A. Logan College before finishing his playing career with two seasons at Southern Illinois.  His coaching career began immediately after his playing career ended, as he served as a graduate assistant under Itch Jones at Southern Illinois from 1989–1990.  When Jones was offered the head coaching position at Illinois following the 1990 season, Hartleb went with him and served as an Illinois assistant from 1991–2005. Under Hartleb, the Fighting Illini have appeared in four NCAA Tournaments.

Hartleb became the head coach at Illinois when Jones retired at the end of the 2005 season.  The Illini qualified for four Big Ten Tournaments in Hartleb's first five seasons, finishing with an above-.500 record in each.  They failed to make an NCAA Tournament or win more than one game in a Big Ten Tournament, however, and media outlets raised the possibility that Hartleb's contract would not be renewed following the 2010.  It was, however, and Illinois won the Big Ten regular season and tournament titles the following year, qualifying for the NCAA Tournament.  There, the team went 2–2 and reached a regional final.  After missing the Big Ten Tournament in 2012, Illinois reached another NCAA Tournament in 2013.  Following the season, Hartleb signed a new, multi-year contract.

Head coaching record
The following is a table of Hartleb's yearly records as a collegiate head baseball coach.

Personal
Due to the death of his father, Hartleb spent some time away from the team during the 2014 season.

See also
List of current NCAA Division I baseball coaches
Illinois Fighting Illini

References

1966 births
Living people
Baseball catchers
Illinois Fighting Illini baseball coaches
Southern Illinois Salukis baseball coaches
Southern Illinois Salukis baseball players
John A. Logan Volunteers baseball players
People from Hamilton, Ohio